Teladorsagia is a genus of nematodes belonging to the family Trichostrongylidae.

The genus has cosmopolitan distribution.

Species:

Teladorsagia circumcincta 
Teladorsagia davtiani 
Teladorsagia trifurcata

References

Nematodes